Thatta Musa is a village in the district of Gujrat, Pakistan.

References

Villages in Gujrat District